Nancy Duarte is an American writer, speaker, and CEO. Duarte is the author of several books, including slide:ology: The Art and Science of Creating Great Presentations (2008), Resonate: Present Visual Stories that Transform Audiences (2010), the HBR Guide to Persuasive Presentations (2012), and Illuminate: Ignite Change Through Speeches, Stories, Ceremonies and Symbols (2016). She is the CEO of Duarte, Inc.

Education 
Duarte holds an MDE from the Anderson School of Management at UCLA.

Career 
Duarte worked with Al Gore on the documentary slide show known as An Inconvenient Truth. Duarte has also worked with TED Talks on quality changes for the presentations given at their events, and has presented her own TED Talks as well. She has been cited by publications writing about presentation style including The Guardian. She is currently the CEO of her eponymous company Duarte, Inc. The company has created tens of thousands of presentations for use by various companies and organizations.

Books
Duarte's first book was slide:ology: The Art and Science of Creating Great Presentations. Published in 2008, the book discusses the elements of effective public presentations. In 2010 she published her second book, Resonate: Present Visual Stories that Transform Audiences, a follow-up to her first book that expands upon her method of creating professional presentations. Part of the book draws upon a pattern Duarte states is common among great narrators or storytellers, where they spend time moving between "what is" and "what could be". Duarte's third book, The Harvard Business Review Guide to Persuasive Presentations, was released in 2012. In 2016, Duarte coauthored the book Illuminate: Ignite Change Through Speeches, Stories, Ceremonies and Symbols with Patti Sanchez. In 2019, Duarte published her fourth book ‘’DataStory: Explain Data and Inspire Action Through Story’’.

References

External links
 Duarte Design
 TEDxTalk video Nov 2011
 Resonate: The Nancy Duarte Interview
 "MTN. VIEW WOMAN ON D.C. AGENDA SHE'LL ADDRESS THOUSANDS AT CHRISTIAN YOUTH RALLY" - San Jose Mercury News
 "Duarte Design helps other firms make a point" DesignTaxi
 "InfoComm 2007" - InformIt
 "To Appeal to Women, Too, Gadgets Go Beyond ‘Cute’ and ‘Pink’" - New York Times
 "slide:ology--New from O'Reilly: The Art and Science of Creating Great Presentations" - O'Reilly Media
 "Silicon Valley Design Firm Holds Thirteenth Annual Pumpkin Contest" - International Business Times
"Mountain View's Duarte Design lives in the presentation" - Business Journal

Living people
Year of birth missing (living people)